The 1st constituency of the Saône-et-Loire is a French legislative constituency in the Saône-et-Loire département.

Description

The 1st constituency of the Saône-et-Loire is based around the town of Mâcon in the south of Saône-et-Loire.

At the 2012 election Thomas Thévenoud of the Socialist Party defeated the long term incumbent conservative Gérard Voisin who had held the seat since 1993. Since 2017, the seat has been held by Benjamin Dirx of the centrist LREM party.

Historic Representation

Election results

2022

 
 
|-
| colspan="8" bgcolor="#E9E9E9"|
|-

2017

 
 
 
 
 
 
 
 
|-
| colspan="8" bgcolor="#E9E9E9"|
|-

2012

 
 
 
 
 
 
 
|-
| colspan="8" bgcolor="#E9E9E9"|
|-

Sources
Official results of French elections from 2002: "Résultats électoraux officiels en France" (in French).

1